This is an alphabetical list of countries by past and projected Gross Domestic Product, based on the Purchasing Power Parity (PPP) methodology, not on market exchange rates. These figures have been taken from the International Monetary Fund's World Economic Outlook (WEO) Database, October 2022 Edition. The figures are given or expressed in Millions of International Dollars at current prices.


IMF estimates between 1980 and 1989

IMF estimates between 1990 and 1999

IMF estimates between 2000 and 2009

IMF estimates between 2010 and 2019

IMF projections for 2020 through 2027

The following list contains the various countries' projected GDP (PPP) from 2020 to 2027.

GDP (PPP) milestones by countries
The following is a list of countries reaching a certain threshold of GDP (PPP) in a specific year according to International Monetary Fund. As for the Soviet Union, its GDP (PPP) reached 2.66 trillion USD in 1990, but it is unknown in which year did its economy surpass the 1 trillion and 2 trillion hallmark.

Long term GDP estimates 
The following table is an OECD Long Term Projections made in February 2022 for largest 16 economies by GDP using PPP exchange rates from 2030 to 2060.

The following table is an estimate for largest 10 economies by nominal GDP using PPP exchange rates for 2030 made by UK based Standard Chartered in January 2019.

See also
 List of IMF ranked countries by GDP, IMF ranked GDP (nominal), GDP (nominal) per capita, GDP (PPP), GDP (PPP) per capita, Population, and PPP
 List of countries by past and projected GDP (nominal)
 List of countries by past and projected future population

References
International Monetary Fund (IMF), World Economic Outlook (WEO) Database, October 2022 edition, Gross domestic product based on purchasing-power-parity (PPP) valuation of country GDP, current international dollars.

External links
IMF website
https://www.imf.org/en/Publications/WEO/weo-database/2022/October October 2022 World Economic Outlook (WEO) Database]
Archive of the WEO databases, from 1999 to 2011



GDP (PPP) Past and Projected